John Wilkie (1860–1934) was an American journalist and Chief of the United States Secret Service.

John Wilkie may also refer to:

John Wilkie (canoeist) (born 1977), Australian canoeist
John Wilkie (footballer) (born 1947), Scottish footballer
John Wilkie (cricketer) (1877–1963), New Zealand cricketer

See also
Jack Wilkie (fl. 1890s), Scottish footballer with Partick Thistle, Rangers, Blackburn Rovers
John Wilke (1954–2009), American investigative reporter
John C. Willke (1925–2015), American medical doctor, author, and anti-abortion activist